Razzaq, Razzak or Razak (Arabic, Persian, Urdu: رزاق) is one of the names of God in Islam, meaning provider or sustainer.
Razzaq may refer to:

People
Abdul Razzaq (cricketer) (born 1979), Pakistani cricketer
Abdur Razzaq, a given name and surname (including a list of people with the name)
Abdur Razzak (actor) (born 1942), Bangladeshi actor commonly known as Razzak
Razzaq Farhan (born 1977), Iraqi footballer and Olympic athlete
Sheikh Razzak Ali (1928–2015), Bangladeshi politician
Zahid Razzak (born 1967), Bangladeshi cricketer, played 1988–1990
Abdur Razzak (cricketer) (born 1982), Bangladeshi cricketer

Places
Razzaq, Iran, a village in Razavi Khorasan Province, Iran

See also
Razaq (disambiguation)

Names of God in Islam